ATV Offroad Fury: Blazin' Trails is a racing video game for the PlayStation Portable. It is a port of ATV Offroad Fury 3.

Gameplay 
ATV Offroad Fury: Blazin' Trails revolves around racing all-terrain vehicles (ATVs) around a dirt track. Another major focus of the game is stunts. Stunts can be achieved by tapping a combination of buttons while the player's ATV is in the air. Each stunt requires a different amount of time to perform. In addition to racing, the game offers mini-games, training courses and a career mode.

The game also offers online play via a WiFi connection.

Reception 

The game was met with mixed reception upon release, as GameRankings gave it a score of 65.38%, while Metacritic gave it 63 out of 100, indicating "mixed or average reviews".

References

External links 
 

2005 video games
ATV Offroad Fury
MX vs. ATV
Multiplayer and single-player video games
PlayStation Portable games
PlayStation Portable-only games
Racing video games
Sony Interactive Entertainment games
Video games developed in the United Kingdom
SouthPeak Games